The following elections occurred in the year 1980.

Africa
 1980 Angolan legislative election
 1980 Cameroonian presidential election
 1980 Cape Verdean parliamentary election
 1980 Gabonese legislative election
 1980 Guinean legislative election
 1980 Ivorian parliamentary election
 1980 Ivorian presidential election
 1980 São Toméan legislative election
 1980 Southern Rhodesian general election
 1980 Sudanese parliamentary election
 1980 Tanzanian general election
 1980 Ugandan general election

Asia
 1980 Iranian legislative election
 1980 Iranian presidential election
 1980 Japanese House of Councillors election
 1980 Japanese general election
 1980 Philippine Kabataang Barangay election
 1980 Philippine local elections
 1980 Republic of China legislative election
 1980 Singaporean general election
 1980 South Korean presidential election

India
 1980 Indian general election
 1980 Indian general election in Andhra Pradesh
 1980 Indian general election in Tamil Nadu
 1980 Tamil Nadu Legislative Assembly election

Australia
 1980 Australian federal election
 1980 Denison state by-election
 1980 Northern Territory general election
 1980 Norwood state by-election
 1980 Queensland state election
 1980 Western Australian state election

Europe
 Austrian presidential election 
 Gibraltar general election
 Icelandic presidential election
 Polish legislative election
 Portuguese presidential election
 Portuguese legislative election
 Umbrian regional election
 Venetian regional election

Germany
 [West German federal election
 :de:Landtagswahl in Baden-Württemberg 1980 
 :de:Landtagswahl im Saarland 1980

Spain
 Basque parliamentary election
 Catalan parliamentary election

United Kingdom
 1980 Glasgow Central by-election
 1980 Labour Party leadership election (UK)
 1980 Southend East by-election

United Kingdom local
 1980 United Kingdom local elections

English local
 1980 Manchester Council election
 1980 Trafford Council election
 1980 Wolverhampton Council election

North America
 1980 Honduran Constituent Assembly election
 1980 Honduran presidential election
 1980 Panamanian parliamentary election

Canada
 1980 Brantford municipal election
 1980 Edmonton municipal election
 1980 Canadian federal election
 1980 Manitoba municipal elections
 1980 Ontario municipal elections
 1980 Ottawa municipal election
 1980 Quebec independence referendum
 1980 Toronto municipal election

Caribbean
 1980 Antigua and Barbuda general election
 1980 Jamaican general election
 1980 Tobago House of Assembly election

United States
 1980 United States presidential election
 1980 United States Senate elections
 1980 United States elections
 1980 United States gubernatorial elections

United States gubernatorial
 1980 Arkansas gubernatorial election
 1980 United States gubernatorial elections
 1980 Washington gubernatorial election

Alabama
 United States Senate election in Alabama, 1980

Alaska
 United States Senate election in Alaska, 1980

Arkansas
 1980 Arkansas gubernatorial election
 United States Senate election in Arkansas, 1980

California
 United States House of Representatives elections in California, 1980
 United States Senate election in California, 1980

Colorado
 United States Senate election in Colorado, 1980

Connecticut
 United States Senate election in Connecticut, 1980

Georgia (U.S. state)
 United States Senate election in Georgia, 1980

Idaho
 United States Senate election in Idaho, 1980

Illinois
 United States Senate election in Illinois, 1980

Indiana
 United States Senate election in Indiana, 1980

Iowa
 United States Senate election in Iowa, 1980

Massachusetts
 Proposition 2½

New Hampshire
 United States Senate election in New Hampshire, 1980

New York
 United States Senate election in New York, 1980

North Carolina
 United States Senate election in North Carolina, 1980

North Dakota
 United States Senate election in North Dakota, 1980

Ohio
 United States Senate election in Ohio, 1980

Oklahoma
 United States Senate election in Oklahoma, 1980

Oregon
 United States Senate election in Oregon, 1980

Pennsylvania
 United States Senate election in Pennsylvania, 1980

South Carolina
 United States House of Representatives elections in South Carolina, 1980
 United States Senate election in South Carolina, 1980

South Dakota
 United States Senate election in South Dakota, 1980

United States House of Representatives
 1980 United States House of Representatives elections
 United States House of Representatives elections in California, 1980
 United States House of Representatives elections in South Carolina, 1980

United States Senate
 1980 United States Senate elections
 United States Senate election in Alabama, 1980
 United States Senate election in Alaska, 1980
 United States Senate election in Arkansas, 1980
 United States Senate election in California, 1980
 United States Senate election in Colorado, 1980
 United States Senate election in Connecticut, 1980
 United States Senate election in Georgia, 1980
 United States Senate election in Idaho, 1980
 United States Senate election in Illinois, 1980
 United States Senate election in Indiana, 1980
 United States Senate election in Iowa, 1980
 United States Senate election in New Hampshire, 1980
 United States Senate election in New York, 1980
 United States Senate election in North Carolina, 1980
 United States Senate election in North Dakota, 1980
 United States Senate election in Ohio, 1980
 United States Senate election in Oklahoma, 1980
 United States Senate election in Oregon, 1980
 United States Senate election in Pennsylvania, 1980
 United States Senate election in South Carolina, 1980
 United States Senate election in South Dakota, 1980
 United States Senate election in Washington, 1980
 United States Senate election in Wisconsin, 1980

Washington (U.S. state)
 United States Senate election in Washington, 1980
 1980 Washington gubernatorial election

Wisconsin
 United States Senate election in Wisconsin, 1980

Oceania
 1980 East Coast Bays by-election
 1980 Northern Maori by-election
 1980 Onehunga by-election

Australia
 1980 Australian federal election
 1980 Denison state by-election
 1980 Northern Territory general election
 1980 Norwood state by-election
 1980 Queensland state election
 1980 Western Australian state election

South America
 1980 Chilean constitutional referendum

 
1980
Elections